Gornji Ajdovec (in older sources Gorenja Ajdovica) is a settlement in the Municipality of Žužemberk in southeastern Slovenia. It lies in the hills to the east of Dvor in the historical region of Lower Carniola. The municipality is now included in the Southeast Slovenia Statistical Region.

References

External links
Gornji Ajdovec at Geopedia

Populated places in the Municipality of Žužemberk